Barnfield College is the largest further education college in Bedfordshire, England, with two campuses in Luton.

Campus locations 
New Bedford Road Campus, New Bedford Road, Luton, LU2 7BF
Technology Campus, Enterprise Way, Luton, LU3 4BU

Faculty areas 
Faculty of Business Enterprise and Retail
 Business and Management	
 Hospitality and Catering
 Accountancy
 Higher Education

Faculty of Creative Arts
 Art and Design
 Hairdressing
 Media and Communications
 Beauty and Holistic Therapy
 Performing Arts and Music
 Fashion and Textiles
 Higher Education

Faculty of Technology
 Construction Trades
 Plumbing
 Electrical
 Computing
 Engineering
 Networking
 Motor Vehicle
 Higher Education

Faculty of Care, Public Services, Sport and Leisure
 Child Care
 Public Services
 Health and Social Care/HE
 Sport and Fitness
 Travel and Tourism
 Dental
 Higher Education/Access

Faculty of Skills Development
 Additional and Learning Support
 Functional Skills
 Language Skills

History

Origin
In 1958, Luton Technical School moved to a new building off Barnfield Avenue, and the name of the school was changed to Barnfield Secondary Technical School.  With the introduction of comprehensive schools in Luton in 1967, it became Barnfield High School.  The number of pupils declined; in 1968 parts of the building were taken over for teaching hairdressing and dressmaking; and in 1970 the College of Further Education took over the whole building.

In 2003, Barnfield College became the first general further education college to be awarded Beacon status.

Barnfield Federation
Peter Birkett was appointed as principal in 2005, and the College became the first further education college in Britain to sponsor an academy school (Barnfield South Academy and Barnfield West Academy). By 2007, the Barnfield Federation included a nursery, primary and secondary schools and a college. In 2010, it opened one of the first studio schools in Britain (Barnfield Skills Academy). The Federation was also the first to launch a 14-18 Law & Accountancy Academy for students who would like to follow a career as an Accountant or Lawyer.

As of October 2013, the federation was under investigation by the Department for Education and the Skills Funding Agency. A key element of the investigation focussed on a £915,000 funding claim for students that did not study at the college. The outcomes of the investigations were jointly announced on 28 February 2014 by multiple news sources, which summarised reports from the Further Education Commissioner, the Skills Funding Agency and the Education Funding Agency.

In July 2014 it was announced that the schools would be split from Barnfield College to form their own multi-academy trust. The college would then focus on further and higher education provision. In 2015 the schools split from Barnfield and formed the Shared Learning Trust.

Merger with West Herts College
At the end of January 2019, the college legally became part of West Herts College, although it has continued to operate under the name of Barnfield College.

Notable alumni 
 Rankin, portrait photographer & director
 Glyn Dillon, graphic artist and costume designer

References 

Further education colleges in Bedfordshire
Further education in Luton
Educational institutions established in 1968
Learning and Skills Beacons
1968 establishments in England
Buildings and structures in Luton